Tsiy-William Ndenge (born 13 June 1997) is a German professional footballer who plays as a midfielder for Grasshoppers in the Swiss Super League.

Club career
A youth product of Borussia Mönchengladbach, he represented their reserve squad in the Regionalliga West, in the German fourth tier, as well as Eredivisie side Roda JC Kerkrade on loan in the 2017–18 season. In 2018, he moved to FC Luzern for a reported 650,000 CHF and collected 44 caps for Luzern in the Swiss Super League. In his final season at Luzern, he barely saw any play anymore, making only six appearances in the league. 

On 30 June 2022, he signed for Grasshopper Club Zürich on a free transfer. In his first official game for Grasshoppers, he was nominated to the starting lineup in a 2–1 win over FC Lugano on 24 July 2022. On 6 August 2022, he scored his first goal for the Grasshoppers, with a shot from 20 meters, equalizing the game mere seconds before the half-time break. He scored a second goal in the same game in the 69th minute for the 3–2 winner over FC St. Gallen. It was his first ever goals in the Swiss Super League and earned him the MVP title for the match. On 10 February 2023, he signed an early contract extension with the Grasshoppers, keeping him at the club until 2025. In his first half year with the Grasshoppers, he played 16 of 19 games, scoring three goals and supplying one assist, and became an important focal point in the midfield.

International career
Ndenge represented Germany at under-19 and under-20 level. In October 2020, he was called up to the Cameroon senior squad for the first time but did not make any appearances.

Personal life
Born in Germany, Ndenge is of Cameroonian descent.

References

External links
 

1997 births
Living people
German people of Cameroonian descent
German footballers
Footballers from Cologne
Association football midfielders
Germany youth international footballers
Eredivisie players
Swiss Super League players
Borussia Mönchengladbach II players
Borussia Mönchengladbach players
Roda JC Kerkrade players
FC Luzern players
German expatriate footballers
German expatriate sportspeople in the Netherlands
Expatriate footballers in the Netherlands
German expatriate sportspeople in Switzerland
Expatriate footballers in Switzerland